Gianluca Giovannini (born 9 December 1983) is an Italian footballer who plays for Venezia.

Biography

Ternana
Born in Amelia, the Province of Terni, Umbria region, Giovannini started his career at the capital of the province – Terni, for Ternana Calcio. Since 2003 Giovannini left for Serie C clubs in temporary deals. In 2005 Giovannini was signed by Serie C1 club Lucchese in co-ownership deal.

Manfredonia & Foligno
In June 2006 Ternana bought back Giovannini and re-sold Giovannini to Manfredonia also in co-ownership. In June 2007 Manfredonia acquired Giovannini outright.

However in August he left for Foligno.

Padova
In 2008, he was signed by Padova in 3-year contract. On 31 August 2010 Giovannini returned to the city of Foligno, Umbria as part of the deal that Padova signed half of the registration rights of Marco Gallozzi.

Ascoli & Venezia
On 18 August 2011 Ascoli signed Giovannini outright for free in 1-year deal as part of the deal that Padova acquired another 50% registration rights of Jonas Portin from Ascoli.

In July 2012 he trained with A.S. Gubbio 1910 but refused to sign a contract on 23 July. In September 2012 he joined Venezia in 2-year contract.

References

External links
 Lega Serie B profile  

Italian footballers
Ternana Calcio players
A.C. Legnano players
S.S. Fidelis Andria 1928 players
S.S.D. Lucchese 1905 players
Manfredonia Calcio players
A.S.D. Città di Foligno 1928 players
Calcio Padova players
Ascoli Calcio 1898 F.C. players
Venezia F.C. players
Serie B players
Association football defenders
Sportspeople from the Province of Terni
1983 births
Living people
Footballers from Umbria